Frank D. Kehoe (February 8, 1882 – December 26, 1949) was an American diver and water polo player.  He represented the United States at the 1904 Summer Olympics in St. Louis, where he won a bronze medal in the diving competition and a silver medal in the water polo competition.

References

External links
 
 

American male water polo players
Olympic silver medalists for the United States in water polo
Olympic bronze medalists for the United States in water polo
Olympic divers of the United States
Divers at the 1904 Summer Olympics
Water polo players at the 1904 Summer Olympics
Olympic medalists in diving
American male divers
1882 births
1949 deaths
Medalists at the 1904 Summer Olympics